USRC Manhattan  was an iron-hulled harbor tug that served as a Revenue Cutter and was originally assigned to New York City harbor and Long Island Sound, but in 1875 she was moved to the Great Lakes with stations at Ogdensburg and Oswego, New York. After 1885 she was advertised for sale but was withdrawn and reassigned to the Hudson River and Long Island Sound. After decommissioning in 1917, she was moved to Baltimore, Maryland and renamed Arundel because a new Manhattan was being built.  Although no longer in commission, she served as a station vessel until sold in 1927.

References
  

Ships of the United States Revenue Cutter Service
1873 ships